Daniel Pollo Baroni (born 5 May 1982), known as Daniel Paulista, is a Brazilian professional football coach and former player who played as a defensive midfielder.

Playing career
Daniel Paulista was born in Ribeirão Preto, São Paulo, and started his career at hometown club Comercial. In 2003, he moved to Santos, being the immediate backup of Paulo Almeida as the club finished second in the league.

In 2004, Daniel Paulista was deemed surplus to requirements by new head coach Vanderlei Luxemburgo, and was released on 6 July of that year. He would play for Juventude, Sertãozinho and São Caetano in the following two years, only impressing with the latter.

In 2007 Daniel Paulista moved to Corinthians, but was loaned to Náutico in May of that year. On 2 January 2008, after his loan expired, he signed for Sport.

In September 2008, after winning the year's Copa do Brasil, Daniel Paulista moved abroad for the first time of his career, after agreeing to a four-year deal with Romanian Liga I club FC Rapid București for a € 800,000 fee. The following January, however, he left the club after appearing rarely, and subsequently returned to former club Sport.

Daniel Paulista left the Leão in January 2012, after struggling with several injuries. He subsequently represented Botafogo-SP, Comercial, Audax and ABC, retiring with the latter in 2014 at the age of 32.

Coaching career
In July 2014 Daniel Paulista returned to Sport, as Eduardo Baptista's assistant. On 17 September of the following year, as Baptista left for Fluminense, he was named interim head coach until the arrival of Paulo Roberto Falcão.

On 13 October 2016, Daniel was appointed as first team coach until the end of the year, replacing Oswaldo de Oliveira. He returned to his previous role in the following year, but subsequently acted as interim on two more occasions.

On 7 May 2018, Daniel took over Boa Esporte, but left the club less than two months later. He was appointed in charge of Confiança the following 12 March, leading the club to their promotion to the Série B.

On 15 February 2020, Daniel returned to Sport, being named head coach in the place of sacked Guto Ferreira, but was himself sacked on 24 August. On 16 September, he returned to his former club Confiança.

On 10 May 2021, after being knocked out of the year's Campeonato Sergipano, Daniel left Confiança on a mutual agreement. Thirteen days later, he replaced Allan Aal at the helm of Guarani.

On 4 May 2022, Daniel left Bugre on a mutual agreement. Ten days later, he took over CRB also in the second tier.

Honours
Santos
Copa Paulista: 2004
Campeonato Brasileiro Série A: 2004

Sport
Campeonato Pernambucano: 2008, 2009, 2010 
Copa do Brasil: 2008

References

External links

1982 births
Living people
Brazilian footballers
Association football midfielders
Campeonato Brasileiro Série A players
Campeonato Brasileiro Série B players
Campeonato Brasileiro Série C players
Comercial Futebol Clube (Ribeirão Preto) players
Santos FC players
Esporte Clube Juventude players
Sertãozinho Futebol Clube players
Associação Desportiva São Caetano players
Sport Club Corinthians Paulista players
Clube Náutico Capibaribe players
Sport Club do Recife players
Botafogo Futebol Clube (SP) players
Grêmio Osasco Audax Esporte Clube players
ABC Futebol Clube players
Liga I players
FC Rapid București players
Brazilian expatriate footballers
Brazilian expatriate sportspeople in Romania
Expatriate footballers in Romania
Brazilian football managers
Campeonato Brasileiro Série A managers
Campeonato Brasileiro Série B managers
Sport Club do Recife managers
Boa Esporte Clube managers
Associação Desportiva Confiança managers
Guarani FC managers
Clube de Regatas Brasil managers
People from Ribeirão Preto
Footballers from São Paulo (state)